WLCT (102.1 FM, "Country 102.1 FM") is a radio station broadcasting a country music format. Licensed to Lafayette, Tennessee, United States, the station is currently owned by Lafayette Broadcasting Co., Inc. and features programming from Fox News Radio and Westwood One.

Programming 
In addition to is usual country music playlist, WLCT also broadcasts Tennessee Volunteers football game broadcasts by the IMG College-operated Vol Network.

WLCT also broadcasts Macon County High School football and basketball. Hourly news updates at the top of each hour are provided by Fox News Radio.
The audio of the station is also heard in the background of North Central Telephone Cooperative cable channel 15.

References

External links
 
 

Country radio stations in the United States
LCT
Macon County, Tennessee